Soluno-Dmitriyevskoye is a rural locality (a village) in Andropovsky District of Stavropol Krai, Russia. Population:

References

Rural localities in Stavropol Krai